Vinh Stadium is a multi-use stadium in Vinh, Vietnam.  It is currently used mostly for football matches and is the home stadium of Sông Lam Nghệ An F.C. The stadium holds 12,000 people.

References

External links
Stadium information

 Vinh
Vinh
Buildings and structures in Nghệ An province